Gammaridacarus is a genus of mites in the family Laelapidae.

Species
 Gammaridacarus brevisternalis Canaris, 1962

References

Laelapidae